JEDA Technologies, Inc. (“JEDA”) is a provider of software products in the front-end of electronic design automation (EDA) industry, specifically in electronic system-level (ESL) verification automation. JEDA products are applied to design models written in C, C++, SystemC for quality measurement, checking and improvement. The company is headquartered in Santa Clara, California with R&D offices in China.

History
The company was founded in 2002.

The founders of the company were creators and inventors of the Vera hardware verification language.

References
 "Checking for TLM-2.0 Compliance - Why Bother? ", NASCUG 2009
 "JEDA CODE COVERAGE TOOL FOR ESL SYSTEM DESIGN", OSCI 2007
 "JEDA VALIDATION TOOLS SUITE TO REDUCE ESL PROJECT RISKS", OSCI 2008
 "Library bolsters SystemC", EETimes 2007
 "Transaction assertions boost Jeda NSCa suite", EETimes 2006
 "SystemC assertions go 'native'", EETimes 2006

Electronic design automation companies